Hari Om Vithala is a Marathi movie released on 24 October 2008.The movie has been produced and directed by Saad Dalvi.

Cast 

The cast includes Makrand Anaspure, Nisha Parulekar, Amita Khopkar, Jayang Savarkar & others.

Soundtrack
The music has been provided by Abhijit Joshi.

Track listing

References

External links 
  Movie Album - smashits.com

2008 films
2000s Marathi-language films